Trevor Segstro (born September 11, 1978) is a Canadian former professional ice hockey player.

Segstro attended the University of Calgary where he played five seasons (1998 – 2003) of CIS hockey with the Calgary Dinos men's ice hockey team. He went on to play professionally in the United Hockey League (UHL), scoring 29 goals and 36 assists for 65 points, while earning 44 penalty minutes in 108 UHL games played.

References

External links

1978 births
Living people
Adirondack Frostbite players
Adirondack IceHawks players
Canadian ice hockey right wingers
Elmira Jackals (UHL) players
Portland Pirates players
University of Calgary alumni
Ice hockey people from Calgary
Canadian expatriate ice hockey players in the United States